Gerry Walsh (4 May 1932 – 17 December 2017) was an Australian rules footballer who played with Richmond in the Victorian Football League (VFL).

Walsh left Richmond in 1952, before he had played a senior game, to join Mordialloc. A centreman, he was a member of Mordialloc's 1952 premiership team. He returned to Richmond in 1953 and made one appearance for the club, in their round four loss to St Kilda at Junction Oval. In 1954 he began playing for Oakleigh.

References

1932 births
2017 deaths
Australian rules footballers from Victoria (Australia)
Richmond Football Club players
Mordialloc Football Club players
Oakleigh Football Club players